Gule, also known as Anej, Fecakomodiyo, and Hamej, is an extinct language of Sudan.  It is generally classified as one of the Koman languages.  It is poorly attested, and Hammarström judges the evidence to be insufficient for classification as Koman. Others however accept it as Koman, though too poorly attested to be much help in reconstructing that family.

The language was spoken by the inhabitants of Jebel Gule in Blue Nile State, Sudan. Speakers had shifted to Arabic by the late 20th century.

See also
Gule word lists (Wiktionary)

References

Languages of Sudan
Koman languages
Unclassified languages of Africa
Languages extinct in the 20th century
Extinct languages of Africa